Dany Alejandro Rosero Valencia (born 6 October 1993) is a Colombian professional footballer who plays as a centre-back for Sporting Kansas City.

Notes

References

External links
 
 

1993 births
Living people
Colombian footballers
Colombian expatriate footballers
Arsenal de Sarandí footballers
Deportivo Cali footballers
Argentine Primera División players
Categoría Primera A players
Expatriate footballers in Argentina
Footballers from Bogotá
Association football defenders
Sporting Kansas City players
Colombian expatriate sportspeople in the United States
Expatriate soccer players in the United States